Meri "Masha" Mnjoyan (born February 7, 1995), is an Armenian singer, the winner of The Voice of Armenia television singing competition in 2013.

Life and career 
Meri Mnjoyan was born at February 7, 1995 in Gyumri, Armenia.

Starting from 1999 she was involved with Deghcanik junior ensemble, and in 2000 had the first solo concert.

From 2001 to 2009 she have studied at the No. 7 basic school of Gyumri and at Gyumri Art School named after N. Tigranyan faculty of vocals and piano from 2002.

From 2009 to 2013 studied at the Yerevan State Culture college. In 2013 she has been enrolled at the Komitas State Conservatory of Yerevan, faculty of jazz-vocals which she graduated from in 2017.

From 2009 to 2019 she was performing at the "Our Lady of Armenia Boghossian Educational Centre's" choir, and with the choir she performed at Vatican City in 2015 as part of a holy communion commemorating the centenary after Armenian genocide.

2013: The Voice of Armenia 
In 2013, Mnjoyan auditioned for The Voice of Armenia. All the coaches turned around. She picked Sona as her coach.

2020: The Voice of Australia 
In 2020, Mnjoyan auditioned for The Voice of Australia. All the coaches turned around. She picked Kelly Rowland as her coach.

Other singing contests 
 2007 – an award at "Pearl Berlona" contest in Berlin, Germany. 
 2008 – third at the primary selections of junior Eurovision in Armenia. The same year she wrote the lyrics of, and was a backing vocalist for the song from Armenia at Junior Eurovision in Cyprus. 
 2008 – "Grand Prize" at the "Violet Nana" international competition in Batumi, Georgia. 
 2010 – third place at the "I love Tbilisi" international contest in Tbilisi, Georgia. 
 2011 – first place at the "Alania 2010" international contest in Turkey. 
 2012 – semi-finalist of the "New Wave" international contest in Moscow, Russia.
 2013 – victory in the mega-competition "The Voice of Armenia".
 2013 – seventh place at the "New Wave" international contest in Yurmala, Latvia.
 2016 – backing vocalist at the Eurovision in Stockholm, Sweden.

References

External links
 Mary Mnjoyan – the voice of Armenia 

1973 births
Living people
The Voice (franchise) winners
21st-century Armenian women singers
Armenian pop singers
Armenian-language singers
Russian-language singers
People from Gyumri